Academy Alexandros Football Club is a Greek football club, based in Kilkis, Kilkis, Greece.

Honours

Domestic

 Kilkis FCA champion: 1
 2017–18

 Kilkis FCA Cup Winners: 1
 2018–19

References

Football clubs in Eastern Macedonia and Thrace
Kilkis
Association football clubs established in 1999
1999 establishments in Greece
Gamma Ethniki clubs